Giuseppe Laterza (born 12 November 1970) is an Italian prelate of the Catholic Church who works in the diplomatic service of the Holy See.

Biography
Mons. Giuseppe Laterza was born on 12 November 1970 in Conversano, Bari, Italy. He was ordained a priest for the Diocese of Conversano-Monopoli on 12 November 1994.

He obtained a Baccalaureate in Philosophy (1990), a Baccalaureate in Theology (1993), a Licentiate in Liturgical Theology (1995), a Doctorate in Canon Law (2000) and he graduated from the Pontifical Ecclesiastic Academy in 2003.

He entered the Holy See Diplomatic Service on 1 July 2003, and has served in the apostolic nunciature in Uruguay and Poland, in the Section for Relations with States and International Organizations of the Secretariat of State, and in the Pontifical Representations in Italy and Georgia.

From January 2019, he began serving as a diplomatic Councilor to the Apostolic Nunciature in Georgia and Armenia.

On 5 January 2023, Pope Francis appointed him Titular Archbishop of Vartana and Apostolic Nuncio to the Central African Republic and Chad. He was consecrated as an archbishop on 4 March 2023.

See also
 List of heads of the diplomatic missions of the Holy See

References

Living people
1970 births
Apostolic Nuncios to the Central African Republic
Apostolic Nuncios to Chad
Diplomats of the Holy See
Pontifical Ecclesiastical Academy alumni